Talegaon is a town on the outskirts of the city of Pune, India.

Demographics
At the 2001 Census of India, Talegaon Dabhade had a population of 42,574. Males constituted 53% of the population and females 47%. The average literacy rate was 79%, higher than the national average of 59.5%: male literacy was 83%, and female literacy was 75%. At that time, 11% of the population was under 6 years of age.

At the 2011 Census of India, the village comprised 13,856 households. The population of 56,435 was split between 29,033 males and 27,402 females.

Transport 
Talegaon is served by Talegaon railway station which serves as a terminus for trains running on the Pune Suburban Railway. The station is of two platforms and has four tracks with two footbridges. This serves access to Talegaon Dabhade village and General Motors, Pune plant. PMPML bus service is available. Private taxies are also available.

History 
The Induri (Indori) Fort in Talegaon was constructed by Sarsenapati Khandojirao Yesajirao Dabhade between 1720-21. He was the eldest of the two sons of Yesaji Dabhade (Bodyguard of the Maratha King, Shivaji) and the grandson of Bajaji Dabhade. He was conferred the hereditary title of Sardar Senapati (or Sarsenapati, Commander-in-chief, or equivalent of Duke in British peerage) by Shahuji, the grandson of Shivaji on 11 January. Khanderao Dabhade died at Juna Rajwada in Talegaon Dabhade near Pune, Maharashtra on 27 September 1729. His widow, Sarsenapati Umabai Dabhade, was the first and only woman to become Commander-in-Chief of the Maratha forces in 1732. Their daughter Savitribai Dabhade married Srimant Yeshwantrao Mande (Sardar or equivalent of Earl), a descendent of Moropant Trimbak Pingle, the first Peshwa of the Maratha Empire, serving on Shivaji Maharaj's Ashta Pradhan (Council of Eight Ministers). 

Khanderao Dabhade built the Induri Fort also famous as the 'Sarsenapati Dabhade Gaadi' (seat of power) at Induri in 1720–21. The Samadhi of Sarsenapati Khanderao Dabhade is situated at the Shrimant Sarsenapati Dabhade Baneshwar Mandir in Talegaon Dabhade. The current Srimant is Abhishek Mande Bhot, who ascended upon the 'Gaadi' in 1990 upon turning 15.

List of people from Talegaon Dabhade 
This is a categorized list of notable people who were born or have dwelt in Talegaon, India. Only people who are sufficiently notable to have individual entries on Wikipedia have been included in the list.

 Dr. Sarojini Babar (1920-2008) - prominent folk literater, poetess and writer.
 Malati Bedekar (née Baltai Khare) (1905-2001) - writer in Marathi.
 Ninad Bedekar (1949-2015) - writer, historian and orator
 Pandit Rahul Deshpande (1979-) - Hindustani classical music vocalist; grandson of Pandit Dr. Vasantrao Deshpande.
 Srimant Abhishek Mande Bhot (1982-) - writer, journalist

References 

 
Cities and towns in Pune district